A Roman mosaic is a mosaic made during the Roman period, throughout the Roman Republic and later Empire. Mosaics were used in a variety of private and public buildings,  on both floors and walls, though they competed with cheaper frescos for the latter.  They were highly influenced by earlier and contemporary Hellenistic Greek mosaics, and often included famous figures from history and mythology, such as Alexander the Great in the Alexander Mosaic.

A large proportion of the surviving examples of wall mosaics come from Italian sites such as Pompeii and Herculaneum.  Otherwise, floor mosaics are far more likely to have survived, with many coming from the fringes of the Roman Empire.  The Bardo National Museum in Tunis has an especially large collection from large villas in modern Tunisia.

Development

Perhaps the earliest examples of Greco-Roman mosaic floors date to the late Republican period (2nd century BC) and are from Delos, Greece. Witts claims that tessellated pavements, using tesserae, were used in Europe from the late fifth to early fourth centuries BC. This is contradicted by Ruth Westgate, who contends that the earliest tessellated mosaics of the Hellenistic period date to the 3rd century BC, with the 2nd to early 1st-century BC mosaics of Delos constituting roughly half of the known examples. Hetty Joyce and Katherine M. D. Dunbabin concur with this assessment, asserting that the transition from pebble mosaics to more complex tessellated mosaics originated in Hellenistic-Greek Sicily during the 3rd century BC, developed at sites such as Morgantina and Syracuse. The earliest known pebble mosaics and use of chip pavement are found at Olynthus in Greece's Chalcidice, dated to the 5th to 4th centuries BC, while other examples can be found at Pella, capital of Macedon, dated to the 4th century BC.

The earliest mosaics of Roman Pompeii, dated to the Pompeian First Style of wall painting in the late 2nd and early 1st centuries BC, were clearly derived from the Hellenistic Greek model. However, they contained far more figured scenes on average, less abstract design, the absence of lead strips, as well as an almost complete lack of complex, three-dimensional scenes utilizing polychromy until the Pompeian Second Style of wall painting (80-20 BC).

The mosaics in the Villa Romana del Casale (c. 300 AD) from Roman Sicily perhaps represent the hallmark of mosaic art in the Late Imperial period.

Technology

Roman mosaics are constructed from geometrical blocks called tesserae, placed together to create the shapes of figures, motifs and patterns. Materials for tesserae were obtained from local sources of natural stone, with the additions of cut brick, tile and pottery creating coloured shades of, predominantly, blue, black, red, white and yellow. Polychrome patterns were most common, but monochrome examples are known. Marble and glass were occasionally used as tesserae, as were small pebbles, and precious metals like gold.

Mosaic decoration was not just confined to floors but featured on walls and vaults as well. Traces of guidelines have been found beneath some mosaics, either scored into or painted onto the mortar bedding. The design might also be pegged out in string, or mounted in a wooden frame.

The collapse of buildings in antiquity can, paradoxically, both irrevocably destroy mosaics or protect and preserve them.

Imagery

Roman mosaics frequently depicted religious figures, theatrical scenes, mythological stories, geometric labyrinth patterns, and other decorative designs.

Portraits
Imagery of famous individuals or entertaining scenes are common on Roman mosaics. The Alexander Mosaic from the House of the Faun, Pompeii depicts the Battle of Issus between Alexander the Great and Darius III. In addition to famous people from antiquity, mosaics can depict aspects of daily life. The Gladiator Mosaic from Rome depicts a fighting scene, naming each gladiator involved. A gladiatorial scene is also known from Leptis Magna.

Roman portrait mosaics, as well as Roman portraits in general, often depicted men and women with similar physical features or attire. This practice became especially commonplace during the Imperial Period and dates back to as early as 18 B.C. There is evidence for this in a series of Denarii (roman silver coins), which portray the  goddess Virtus with recognizable Augustan features.

Geometric Mosaics 
One common type of Roman mosaics are geometric mosaics, which there is evidence for all across the Roman Empire. Geometric mosaics are often made up of intricate patterns in the  style of mazes or labyrinths. There are 57 known floor mosaics in the style of labyrinths, and the majority of them are found in private homes or bathhouses. All 57 were cataloged in 1977 by German archeologist, Wiktor Daszewski. Scholar Rebecca Molholt discusses the reasoning behind why so many of the known maze mosaics were found in bathhouses. Maze mosaics were believed to have apotropaic powers and this is reflected in many mosaics which incorporate scenes of mythical creatures or stories. Furthermore, labyrinth mosaics were considered to be bearers of good luck for those who could successfully make their way through the maze. On their way to bathe, athletes likely would walk through these mazes on their way to bathe in preparation for competition. The experience of walking along the labyrinth pattern would have likely heightened the senses, as the participants would be acutely aware of their feet along the mosaic on the floor.

Religion
One of the earliest examples of  Early Christian art in mosaic is the early 4th-century floor mosaic from a villa at Hinton St Mary, Dorset, England, which shows Christ with a Chi-Rho behind his head. The mosaic is now in the British Museum.  Orpheus mosaics, which often include many animals drawn by the god's playing, are very common; he was also used in Early Christian art as a symbol for Christ. Scenes of Dionysus are another common subject.

As the Roman period merged into Late Antiquity, wall mosaics became the dominant form of art in grand churches, and the gold-ground style became usual.  Italy has a high proportion of the surviving examples.

Emblems

Progression within the mosaic technique developed the emblem, the "heart" of all mosaics. The word emblem is used to describe a small mosaic featuring a little genre scene or still life, characterised by particularly thin tesserae made separately and mounted in a central or important position in the main panel.

Recent finds

2020 
In May 2020, the discovery of a well-preserved Roman mosaic floor dating to the 3rd century AD buried underneath a vineyard at Negrar is reported after about a century of searching the site of a long-lost villa.

2022 
In October 2022, a 1,600 year old intact Romain mosaic measuring 20 x 6 meters was found under a building in Al-Rastan, Syria. Al-Rastan, a city near Homs in Syria that was held by rebels until 2018. The building was being excavated Syria's General Directorate of Antiquities and Museums, and was donated by the Lebanese Nabu Museum to the Syrian state. At the time of excavation, it was unclear whether the building which housed the mosaic was a public bathhouse or something else. The mosaic showed mythical scenes including portraying the Roman sea god Neptune and 40 of his mistresses, as well as Hercules slaying the Amazon queen Hippolyta.

Notable examples
The Alexander Mosaic from the House of the Faun, Pompeii
The Tomb of the Julii in the Vatican Necropolis, beneath St. Peter's Basilica, Rome
The Gladiator Mosaic from the Via Casilina outside Rome
The Zliten Mosaic from Zliten in Libya
The "Gypsy Girl" from Gaziantep, Turkey

Gallery

See also

Lod Mosaic Archaeological Center
Proclus (mosaicist)
Roman art
Zeugma Mosaic Museum

References

Sources

External links

Mosaics of Roman Britain
Association for the Study and Preservation of Roman Mosaics
Discovery of Roman mosaic in Lod, Israel
Archaeologists unearth 'little Pompeii' in southeast France

Mosaic
Italian mosaic